The 2008 season is Pohang Steelers' 26th season in the K-League in South Korea. Pohang Steelers competed in K-League, League Cup, Korean FA Cup and AFC Champions League.

Squad

K-League

Regular season

Pld = Matches played; W = Matches won; D = Matches drawn; L = Matches lost; F = Goals for; A = Goals against; GD = Goal difference; Pts = Points

Play-off

Korean FA Cup

League Cup

AFC Champions League

Group stage

Squad statistics

Transfers

In

Loan in

Out 

Loan out

References

Pohang Steelers
2008